The Formosa Plastics Group Museum is located on the grounds of Chang Gung University in Taiwan. After opening to the public in 2004, it became a tourist attraction in Taoyuan. The museum has six above-ground exhibition floors and one basement exhibition area covering over 8,000 square meters. Its main purpose is to educate the general public in regards to the two FPG founders, Wang Yung-Ching and Wang Yung Tsai. 

Free individual, scheduled group, and holiday tours, as well as recorded audio guides are available to visitors.

Architecture

1st Floor: The Spirit of the Formosa Plastics Group
The lobby features the museum's first acquisition, a fifty-thousand-year-old piece of petrified wood at its center. The FPG motto and logo are exhibited on a gold-colored matted steel plate. Digitized panels present the history of the FPG enterprise, including its development and overall values.

2nd Floor: Memorial to the FPG Founder 
This exhibit displays several noteworthy episodes from the founders' lives, beginning from the period of Japanese occupation in the early 20th century. Dioramas feature wax figures engaging in various activities.

3rd Floor: FPG’s Plastic and Textile Business
This floor features the early days of the FPG's history, when it employed primitive ox-carts to transport plastics powders and antique textile machines and the role they play in the company's future development into a modern plastics and textiles enterprise.

4th Floor: FPG’s Sixth Naphtha Cracking Plant and Electronics Business 

Placed along an artificial cavern, a series of small dioramas and models explain the processes of exploration and production for oil, natural gas and coal. Beyond these is a bird’s eye view of the entire of Sixth Naphtha Cracking Plant displayed in miniature beneath a high-strength glass floor. In the fourth floor’s concluding exhibit, the development of FPG’s electronics business is illustrated by the evolution of computer components and circuit boards.

5th Floor: Heavy Transportation Industries, Biotechnology and Green Energy
As they enter the FPG Heavy Transport exhibition, visitors are greeted by models of FPG’s first chemical and oil tankers as well as full sized cargo truck cab. Here, information is available featuring FPG’s globalization and expansion into green energy at the Earth Conservation Theater. Visitors can also experience driving an electric vehicle, manipulate LED lighting and try out other interactive exhibits.

6th Floor: Giving Back to Society 
The motif for this floor follows FPG’s creed: “That which is given by society should, in turn, be repaid for the betterment of society.” FPG has been involved with the community, including investment in educational institutions (including the establishment of three universities and assisting in the reconstruction schools after the 1999 Jiji earthquake), the Chang Gung Hospitals, and the Chang Gung Health and Cultural Village. In addition, FPG has an ongoing commitment to the advancement of medical education and health care in Taiwan and to the protection of disadvantage groups.

B1: Basement floor Kauri Woods and Memorial Gift Shop Area 
This area is the location of a simulated New Zealand Kauri Wood forest. The Memorial Gift Shop offers medical, biotech and environmental items produced by various subsidiaries of the Formosa Plastics Group.

See also
 List of museums in Taiwan

References

External links 
Formosa Plastics Group company website 

2004 establishments in Taiwan
Formosa Plastics Group
Industry museums in Taiwan
Museums established in 2004
Museums in Taoyuan City